Cedevita d.o.o. is a Croatian company which produces a wide range of teas, instant drinks, and dietetic products. A notable owner of the company was the Croatian pharmaceutical company Pliva d.d. Since 2001 Cedevita has been part of the Atlantic Grupa.

Background and history
Cedevita began production in 1929 in Borongaj, Zagreb (where the main factory still operates) as a branch of the Swiss company Wander AG to produce dietetic products.

In 1947, a new facility was built in Trogir for processing of plants and manufacturing of teas.

The company sponsors KK Cedevita, a basketball club in Ljubljana, Slovenia.

Cedevita instant vitamin drinks
The first instant vitamin drink (Orange flavored Cedevita) was created in 1969, however, production did not start until 1970. In 1985, the company launched the lemon flavour drink, and, in 1990, grapefruit. Wild berry and apple flavours were introduced in 1999. Other flavours include tropical and mandarin. A sugar-free version was introduced in 1985. A product line called "Cedevita Junior" was designed for children, with a higher percentage of vitamins and minerals.

According to data published by Atlantic Grupa, Cedevita is Atlantic's best-selling brand. Cedevita is in the Consumer Healthcare Division, accounting for a 24% of the sales.

Market position 
Cedevita d.o.o. has a leading position (over 50% of the market) in the segment of instant vitamin drinks on the Croatian market and in BiH, Slovenia and Serbia.

Product line
 Cedevita (instant drink)
 Vitamin enriched candies (product lines include: Cedevita, Pepermint, Rondo C, and Vau Vau)
 Teas (Cedevita brand name)
 Dietetic products (Naturavita brand name)
 Rondosept (pastilles prescribed for oral inflammation and pharyngitis)
 Rehidromiks (pastilles for acute or chronic diarrhea).

Corporate statistics

 Employees: 251-500
 Benefits during 2008: 25-50 million €
 Established on 1 January 1929

References

 Cedevita D.o.o. - Zagreb 10000 (Zagreb I Zagrebacka), Planinska Bb , OIB 080325879

Food and drink companies established in 1929
Food and drink companies of Croatia
Drink companies of Croatia
Croatian brands
1929 establishments in Croatia
Manufacturing companies based in Zagreb
Sponsor
KK Cedevita Junior
KK Cedevita